The 2016 IIHF World U18 Championship Division III Group A and 2016 IIHF World U18 Championship Division III Group B were a pair of international under-18 men's ice hockey tournaments run by the International Ice Hockey Federation. The Group A and Group B tournaments made up the sixth and seventh level of competition at the 2016 IIHF World U18 Championships. The Group A tournament took place between 14 March and 20 March 2016 in Sofia, Bulgaria. The tournament was won by Australia who gained promotion back to Division II Group B for 2017 while Mexico finished last and was relegated to Division III Group B for 2017. The Group B tournament took place from 14 February to 19 February 2016 in Cape Town, South Africa. New Zealand won the tournament and gained promotion to Division III Group A for 2017.

Division III Group A tournament

The Division III Group A tournament began on 14 March 2016 in Sofia, Bulgaria at the Winter Sports Palace. Bulgaria, Chinese Taipei, Israel and Mexico returned to compete in Division III Group A after missing promotion in the 2015 tournament. Turkey gained promotion to Division III Group A after finishing first in last years Division III Group B tournament and Australia was relegated from Division II Group B after finishing last in the 2015 tournament.

Australia won the tournament after winning four of their five games, finishing first in the group standings and gained promotion back to Division II Group B for the 2017 IIHF World U18 Championships. Turkey finished in second place, one point behind Australia, and Bulgaria in third place. Mexico finished the tournament in last place after losing all five of their games and was relegated to Division III Group B for 2017. Turkey's Ferhat Bakal finished as the top scorer of the tournament with 14 points and Tolga Bozaci led the tournament in goaltending with a save percentage of 91.95. Bakal was also named the best forward by the IIHF directorate. Raz Werner of Israel was named the best goaltender of the tournament and Bulgaria's Atanas Genkov was named best defenceman.

Standings

Fixtures
All times are local. (EET – UTC+2)

Scoring leaders
List shows the top ten skaters sorted by points, then goals.

Leading goaltenders
Only the top five goaltenders, based on save percentage, who have played at least 40% of their team's minutes are included in this list.

Division III Group B tournament

The Division III Group B tournament began on 14 February 2016 in Cape Town, South Africa at the Ice Station. Hong Kong and New Zealand returned to compete in Division III Group B after missing promotion in the 2015 tournament. South Africa entered the competition after being relegated from Division III Group A in 2015.

New Zealand won the tournament after winning all four of their games, finishing first in the group standings and gained promotion to Division III Group A for the 2017 IIHF World U18 Championships. South Africa and Hong Kong both completed the tournament with three points each, with South Africa taking second place with a better goal difference. New Zealand's Benjamin Harford finished as the top scorer of the tournament with eleven points and James Moore led the tournament in goaltending with a save percentage of 92.98. Harford was also named the best forward of the tournament and Moore best goaltender by the IIHF directorate. Thomas Pugh of New Zealand was named best defenceman.

Standings

Fixtures
All times are local. (SAST – UTC+2)

Scoring leaders
List shows the top ten skaters sorted by points, then goals.

Leading goaltenders
Only the top goaltenders, based on save percentage, who have played at least 40% of their team's minutes are included in this list.

References

External links
Division III Group A at IIHF.com
Division III Group B at IIHF.com

IIHF World U18 Championship Division III
Division III
IIHF World U18 Championship Division III
International ice hockey competitions hosted by Bulgaria
International ice hockey competitions hosted by South Africa
World
Sports competitions in Cape Town
IIHF World U18 Championship Division III, 2016
IIHF World U18 Championship Division III
Sports competitions in Sofia
IIHF World U18 Championship Division III, 2016
IIHF World U18 Championship Division III